Countess Anna of Nassau (5 November 1563 – 13 June 1588) was a daughter of William the Silent and his second wife, Anna of Saxony. She was the wife of William Louis, Count of Nassau-Dillenburg.

Biography 
Anna and William Louis were married just after Anna's twenty fourth birthday on November 25, 1587. The marriage was however only a short one, Anna died only six months after the marriage; therefore, they had no children and William Louis never remarried. William Louis became Count of Nassau- Dillenburg.

Family 
Anna's mother, Anna of Saxony never had a happy marriage with Anna's father, William the Silent. Anna of Saxony was described as unstable and violent. She was unpopular with her family and the citizens.

Anna of Saxony took up with her lawyer, with whom she had an illegitimate daughter called Christina. After this incident, Anna and her siblings never saw their mother again. Anna of Saxony was sent to Beilstein castle with Christina, here her behavior became worse, until the servants were ordered to keep all knives away from her, lest she attack someone. Anna of Saxony began to suffer from hallucinations and violent outbursts. Christina was removed from her care and sent to be raised with her Anna and her siblings. William annulled their marriage, and remarried twice. Anna lived out the rest of her days in Dresden, until her death aged thirty-two in 1577.

Her father then married Charlotte of Bourbon, with whom he had six daughters. After her death in 1582, William married Louise de Coligny who gave birth to a son, Frederick Henry, Prince of Orange.

Among Anna's siblings were Maurice, Prince of Orange and Emilia of Nassau.

Ancestry

References 

1563 births
1588 deaths
Anna
Anna
People from Delft
Daughters of monarchs